The 2001 ELMS at Jarama was the third race for the 2001 European Le Mans Series season and the fourth round of the American Le Mans Series season.  It took place at Circuito Permanente Del Jarama, Spain, on May 20, 2001.

Official results

Class winners in bold.

Statistics
 Pole Position – #1 Audi Sport Team Joest – 1:22.285
 Fastest Lap – #2 Audi Sport Team Joest – 1:23.035
 Distance – 438.9 km
 Average Speed – 158.506 km/h

External links
 Official Results
 World Sports Racing Prototypes - Race Results

Jarama
Jarama
1000 km Jarama
ELMS at Jarama